The American Association of People with Disabilities (AAPD) is a 501(c)(3) non-profit organization which advocates for the legal rights of people with disabilities. One of the primary purposes of the AAPD is to further the implementation of the provisions of the Americans with Disabilities Act. As a national cross-disability rights organization, AAPD advocates for full civil rights for the 50+ million Americans with disabilities by promoting equal opportunity, economic power, independent living, and political participation.

History 
AAPD was founded on July 25, 1995, by Paul Hearne, Senator Bob Dole, John D. Kemp, Justin Dart, Tony Coelho, Pat Wright, Jim Weisman, Lex Frieden, Sylvia Walker, Paul Marchand, Fred Fay, I. King Jordan, Denise Figueroa, Judi Chamberlin, Bill Demby, Deborah Kaplan, Nancy Bloch, Max Starkloff, Mike Auberger, Neil Jacobson, Ralph Neas, Ron Hartley and others.

Activities

Political activism

Voting 
AAPD's REV UP (Register, Educate, Vote, Use your Power) campaign works to increase voter registration and turnout among people with disabilities, fight election barriers and voter suppression, and educate voters on issues facing the disability community. AAPD works with the non-partisan VoteRiders organization to spread state-specific information on voter ID requirements.

AAPD held the first National Disability Voter Registration Week (NDVRW) in 2016, prior to the 2016 US Presidential Election. Previously held during the third week in July, as of 2021 NDVRW takes place during the third week of September.

Internship Program 
Launched in 2002, the AAPD Summer Internship Program places college students, graduate students, law students, and recent graduates with disabilities in paid summer internships with Congressional offices, federal agencies, nonprofit and for-profit organizations within the Washington, DC area. Additionally, interns are matched with a mentor, and participate in a Disability Advocacy Certificate Program. Notable alumni of the program include Lydia X. Z. Brown, Ari Ne'eman, Stacey Milbern and Leah Katz-Hernandez.

Disability Mentoring Day 
Following a 1999 proclamation from President Bill Clinton, Disability Mentoring Day was established to provide mentorship and career advice for people with disabilities. AAPD administers the program as part of National Disability Employment Awareness Month.

Paul G. Hearne Emerging Leader Awards 
Named for disability rights activist Paul G. Hearne, this award recognizes emerging leaders with disabilities. Recipients receive funding to further a new or existing project or initiative that increases opportunities for people with disabilities. Past recipients include Claudia L Gordon, Lauren Ridloff, Jerry White, Cheri Blauwet, Victor Pineda, Maureen McKinnon-Tucker, Anjali Forber-Pratt, Jason DaSilva, Alice Wong and Lydia X. Z. Brown.

Disability Equality Index 
The Disability Equality Index, joint facilitated by AAPD and Disability:IN, is an annual benchmarking tool for disability inclusion in the workforce. Companies are scored across 6 categories: Culture & Leadership, Enterprise-Wide Access, Employment Practices, Community Engagement, and Supplier Diversity.

NBCUniversal Tony Coehlo Media Scholarship 
Named for former United States Representative and primary sponsor of the Americans with Disabilities Act, Tony Coehlo, this scholarship is funded by NBCUniversal. Eligibility is restricted to students with disabilities who are pursuing careers in media, communications, or entertainment industries.

Disability Rights Storytellers Fellowship 
Managed by Rooted in Rights, the fellowship program provides the opportunity for individuals to combine disability advocacy with digital media storytelling.

Fannie Lou Hamer Leadership Program 
Named for black disabled civil rights and voting rights activist Fannie Lou Hamer, the leadership program provides stipends to young black disabled advocates to create national campaigns that promotes voter registration and participation.

References

External links
 
 American Association of People with Disabilities (AAPD) on Google Cultural Institute

Organizations established in 1995
Disability organizations based in the United States
Health and disability rights organizations in the United States